Boarding may refer to:

Boarding, used in the sense of "room and board", i.e. lodging and meals as in a:
Boarding house
Boarding school 
Boarding (horses) (also known as a livery yard, livery stable, or boarding stable), is a stable where horse owners pay a weekly or monthly fee to keep their horse
Boarding (ice hockey), a penalty called when an offending player violently pushes or checks an opposing player into the boards of the hockey rink
Boarding (transport), transferring people onto a vehicle
Naval boarding, the forcible insertion of personnel onto a naval vessel
Waterboarding, a form of torture

See also
Board (disambiguation)
Embarkment (disambiguation)